Markéta Vondroušová was the defending champion, but lost in the second round to Elise Mertens.

Mertens went on to win the title, defeating Aryna Sabalenka in the final, 7–5, 6–2.

Seeds

Draw

Finals

Top half

Bottom half

Qualifying

Seeds

Qualifiers

Lucky loser

Draw

First qualifier

Second qualifier

Third qualifier

Fourth qualifier

Fifth qualifier

Sixth qualifier

References
Main Draw
Qualifying Draw

Ladies Open Lugano - Singles
Ladies Open Lugano
Lugano